Helen Elliott Donnelly was a fictional character on the now-cancelled American soap opera, Love is a Many Splendored Thing.  She was first played by actress Grace Albertson, who was replaced by actress Gloria Hoye.

Meddling mother
When she was first introduced, Helen was the wife of Philip Elliott, the brother of late war correspondent and Korean War veteran, Mark Elliott.  In fact, her son, Mark was named after his late uncle.  As one of San Francisco's most successful architects, Helen only wanted the best for him.  She did bond well with her niece, Mia Elliott and had in fact allowed the Amerasian to stay with her family.  She eventually went back to Hong Kong after her beau at the time had been discovered to have performed an illegal abortion.

The often well-meaning, but interfering Helen had made no secret her dislike for Mark's fiancee, Iris Donnelly Garrison, and had begun to promote a relationship between Mark and her softer sister, Laura Donnelly, who had recently left a convent. She was absolutely pleased when Mark and Laura married.

Some time later, Phil, Helen's husband and Mark's father, had died, and now she was alone.  She began to bond with Laura's brother, Tom Donnelly, a police officer in San Francisco, and after his divorce from his wife, Martha Donnelly (alias Julie Richards), began to see him and were eventually married. Helen proved to be an excellent mother to her stepson Ricky (Shawn Campbell). Presumably, she and Tom are still married and living in San Francisco.

Donnelly, Helen Elliott